Creature of Habit may refer to:

one who is extremely used to their own habits and does not function well without them
Creatures of Habit (Buffy comic), trade paperback collecting comic stories based on the Buffy television series
"Creatures of Habit", song by Deicide from their 1997 album Serpents of the Light
"Creatures of Habit", song by Soul Asylum from their 1998 album Candy from a Stranger
Creatures of Habit (album), a 1991 album by Billy Squier